The 2013 Southern Conference men's basketball tournament took place between Friday, March 8 and Monday, March 11 in Asheville, North Carolina, at the U.S. Cellular Center. The entire tournament was streamed on ESPN3, with the Southern Conference Championship Game televised by ESPN2. The champion received an automatic bid into the 2013 NCAA tournament.

Bracket
 

All times listed are Eastern

References

External links
 SoCon Basketball Championship

Tournament
SoCon
College sports tournaments in North Carolina
College basketball in North Carolina
Southern Conference men's basketball tournament
Southern Conference men's basketball tournament
Southern Conference men's basketball tournament